Michael Mann is an American film director, screenwriter, and producer

Michael Mann may also refer to:

Michael Mann (bishop) (1924–2011), Anglican bishop
Hollywood Fats (Michael Leonard Mann, 1954–1986), American blues guitarist
Michael Mann (judge) (1930–1998), English judge
Michael Mann (scholar) (1919–1977), musician and professor of German literature
Michael Mann (sociologist) (born 1942), professor of sociology
Michael E. Mann (born 1965), climatologist and geophysicist
Mike Mann, founder of the venture capital firm WashingtonVC

See also
Michael, Isle of Man, one of the six sheadings of Isle of Man
Michael Manning (disambiguation)